Matthew Alsberg, better known by his stage name Antimc, is an American hip hop producer from Los Angeles, California.

Career
Antimc released Free Kamal, a collaborative album with rapper Radioinactive, on Mush Records in 2004.

He released the album, It's Free, but It's Not Cheap on Mush Records in 2006. It featured guest appearances from Busdriver and Andrew Broder, among others.

Discography

Albums
 Instrumentals at Work (1999)
 Old Leg (2001)
 Free Kamal (2004) with Radioinactive
 It's Free, but It's Not Cheap (2006)

EPs
 Run (2003)
 Bitter Breaks One (2003)

Productions
 Radioinactive - "Elevator Shoes" from Fo' Tractor (1999)
 Radioinactive - Pyramidi (2001)

Contributions
 Busdriver - "Handfuls of Sky" and "Scoliosis Jones" from Jhelli Beam (2009)

References

External links
 Antimc on Mush Records
 

Alternative hip hop musicians
American hip hop record producers
American multi-instrumentalists
Living people
Musicians from California
People from Los Angeles
Record producers from California
1978 births